Maximus (Hellenised as Maximos) is the Latin term for "greatest" or "largest". In this connection it may refer to:
 Circus Maximus (disambiguation)
 Pontifex maximus, the highest priest of the College of Pontiffs in ancient Rome

People

Roman historical figures
 Quintus Fabius Maximus Verrucosus (c. 280–203 BC), surnamed Cunctator, "the delayer"
 Magnus Maximus, Roman emperor from 383 to 388
 Maximus of Moesia (fl. 89–117), twice consul
 Maximus of Hispania (409–411), Roman usurper
 Petronius Maximus (396–455), Western Roman Emperor for two and a half months in 455

Authors and philosophers
 Valerius Maximus, 1st-century historian
 Claudius Maximus, 2nd-century Stoic, teacher of emperor Marcus Aurelius
 Maximus of Tyre, 2nd-century Greek philosopher and rhetorician
 Maximus of Ephesus (died 372), 4th-century philosopher, preceptor of emperor Julian
 Ibn Arabi (1165–1240), Muslim mystic and philosopher, called Doctor Maximus
 Maximus Planudes (c. 1260 – c. 1305), Greek monk, anthologist, translator and theologian

Christian saints
 Maximus of Aveia or Maximus of Aquila (died c. 250)
 Maximus of Évreux (died c. 384)
 Maximus of Jerusalem, saint and bishop of Jerusalem (died 350)
 Maximus of Lérins (433–460), bishop of Riez, and 2nd abbot of Lérins Abbey
 Maximus of Naples (died 361)
 Maximus of Pavia (died 511)
 Maximus of Turin (died 465)
 Maximus the Confessor (580–662), theologian
 Maximus the Greek (1475–1556), translator in Russia
 Saints Tiburtius, Valerian and Maximus, martyrs at Rom

Christian bishops and patriarchs
 Maximus I of Antioch, Patriarch of Antioch in 182–191
 Archbishop Maximus I of Constantinople, arch-bishop in 380, opponent of Gregory Nazianzen
 Maximus II of Antioch, Patriarch 449–455
 Maximus (bishop of Zaragoza) (fl. 592–619)
 Maximus (Bishop of Ceneda) (fl. 741–790), Bishop of Ceneda
 Maximus, Metropolitan of all Rus (died 1305)
 Patriarch Maximus II of Constantinople (died 1216)
 Patriarch Maximus III of Constantinople,  Patriarch in 1476–1481
 Patriarch Maximus IV of Constantinople,  Patriarch in 1491–1497
 Patriarch Maximus V of Constantinople (1897–1972), Patriarch in 1946–1948

Fictional characters
 Antillar Maximus, a character in Jim Butcher's Codex Alera series
 Flattus Maximus, lead guitarist of heavy metal act GWAR
 Fortress Maximus, a giant Autobot from the Transformers franchise
 Maximus, a supporting character, the name of a horse in Disney's Tangled
 Maximus (comics), a Marvel Comics villain who frequently opposes the Fantastic Four and the Royal Family of the Inhumans
 Maximus Decimus Meridius, the main character in Ridley Scott's film, Gladiator
 Maximus Mayhem, an antagonist from the animated show M.A.S.K. (TV series)
 Maximus Musicus, the main character of a musical educational franchise of the same name
 Maximus "Max" Zamfirescu, a character in the 1998 movie My Giant

Other
 Gluteus maximus muscle, the largest and most superficial of the three gluteal muscles
 Maximos, the official residence of the Prime Minister of Greece
 Maximus, a 2013 album by King James
 Maximus (BBS), a bulletin board system originally developed by Scott J. Dudley
 Maximus Inc., a publicly traded international corporation based in Tysons Corner, Virginia
 Maximus (racing yacht), a racing yacht built in 2005
 Optimus Maximus keyboard

See also
 Maxim (disambiguation)
 Maxima (disambiguation)
 Maximo (disambiguation)
 Maximum (disambiguation)

Latin masculine given names
Superlatives